A ton-force is one of various units of force defined as the weight of one ton due to standard gravity. The precise definition depends on the definition of ton used.

Tonne-force
The tonne-force (tf or tf) is equal to the weight of one tonne.
{|
|-
|rowspan=6 width=120 valign=top|one tonne-force 
|=  kilograms-force (kgf)
|-
|=  kilonewtons (kN)
|-
|≈  pounds-force (lbf)
|-
|-
|≈  short tons-force
|-
|≈  poundals (pdl)
|}

Long ton-force
The long ton-force is equal to the weight of one long ton.
{|
|-
|rowspan=5 width=120 valign=top|one long ton-force 
|=  lbf
|-
|=  kgf
|-
|= 
|-
|= 1.12 short tons-force
|-
|≈  pdl
|}

Short ton-force
The short ton-force is equal to the weight of one short ton. 
{|
|-
|rowspan=5 width=120 valign=top|one short ton-force 
|=  lbf
|-
|=  kgf
|-
|= 
|-
|-
|≈  pdl
|}

Notes

Units of force